Achromobacter clevelandea is a bacterium from the genus Achromobacter isolated from iron-rich sediment in Cleveland in the United Kingdom.

References 

Burkholderiales
Bacteria described in 2004